Grand Lake Regional Airport  is a privately owned, public use airport in Delaware County, Oklahoma, United States. It is located on Monkey Island, a peninsula on the northern shore of Grand Lake o' the Cherokees. The airport is nine nautical miles (10 mi, 17 km) southeast of Afton, a city in Ottawa County, Oklahoma.

This airport was included in the National Plan of Integrated Airport Systems for 2007–2011, which categorized it as a general aviation facility.

Facilities and aircraft 
Grand Lake Regional Airport covers an area of 60 acres (24 ha) at an elevation of 792 feet (241 m) above mean sea level. It has one runway designated 17/35 with a concrete surface measuring 3,925 by 60 feet (1,196 x 18 m).

For the 12-month period ending October 7, 2009, the airport had 7,000 general aviation aircraft operations, an average of 19 per day. At that time there were 5 aircraft based at this airport: 80% single-engine and 20% multi-engine.

See also 
 Teramiranda Airport

References

External links 
 Grand Lake Regional Airport
 Grand Lake Regional Airport (3O9) at Oklahoma Aeronautics Commission
 Aerial image as of February 1995 from USGS The National Map
 

Airports in Oklahoma
Buildings and structures in Delaware County, Oklahoma
Transportation in Delaware County, Oklahoma